is the capital city of Nara Prefecture, Japan. , Nara has an estimated population of 367,353 according to World Population Review, making it the largest city in Nara Prefecture and sixth-largest in the Kansai region of Honshu. Nara is a core city located in the northern part of Nara Prefecture bordering the Kyoto Prefecture.

Nara was the capital of Japan during the Nara period from 710 to 794 as the seat of the Emperor before the capital was moved to Kyoto. Nara is home to eight temples, shrines, and ruins, specifically Tōdai-ji, Saidai-ji, Kōfuku-ji, Kasuga Shrine, Gangō-ji, Yakushi-ji, Tōshōdai-ji, and the Heijō Palace, together with Kasugayama Primeval Forest, collectively form the Historic Monuments of Ancient Nara, a UNESCO World Heritage Site.

Etymology

A number of theories for the origin of the name "Nara" have been proposed, and some of the better-known ones are listed here. The second theory in the list, from the notable folklorist Kunio Yanagita (1875–1962), is most widely accepted at present.

The Nihon Shoki (The Chronicles of Japan, the second oldest book of classical Japanese history) suggests that "Nara" was derived from narasu (to flatten, to level). According to this account, in September in the tenth year of Emperor Sujin, "leading selected soldiers (the rebels) went forward, climbed Nara-yama (hills lying to the north of Heijō-kyō) and put them in order. Now the imperial forces gathered and flattened trees and plants. Therefore the mountain is called Nara-yama." Though the narrative itself is regarded as a folk etymology and few researchers regard it as historical, this is the oldest surviving suggestion, and is linguistically similar to the following theory by Yanagita.
"Flat land" theory (currently most widely accepted): In his 1936 study of placenames, the author Kunio Yanagita states that "the topographical feature of an area of relatively gentle gradient on the side of a mountain, which is called taira in eastern Japan and hae in the south of Kyushu, is called naru in the Chūgoku region and Shikoku (central Japan). This word gives rise to the verb narasu, adverb narashi, and adjective narushi." This is supported by entries in a dialect dictionary for nouns referring to flat areas: naru (found in Aida District, Okayama Prefecture and Ketaka District, Tottori Prefecture) and naro (found in Kōchi Prefecture); and also by an adjective narui which is not standard Japanese, but is found all across central Japan, with meanings of "gentle", "gently sloping", or "easy". Yanagita further comments that the way in which the fact that so many of these placenames are written using the character  ("flat"), or other characters in which it is an element, demonstrates the validity of this theory. Citing a 1795 document,  from the province of Inaba, the eastern part of modern Tottori, as indicating the reading naruji for the word 平地 (standard reading heichi, meaning "level/flat ground/land/country, a plain"), Yanagita suggests that naruji would have been used as a common noun there until the modern period.
The idea that Nara is derived from  nara (Japanese for "oak, deciduous Quercus spp.") is the next most common opinion. This idea was suggested by a linguist, Yoshida Togo. This noun for the plant can be seen as early as in Man'yōshū (7–8th century) and Harima-no-kuni Fudoki (715). The latter book states the place name Narahara in Harima (around present-day Kasai) derives from this nara tree, which might support Yoshida's theory. Note that the name of the nearby city of Kashihara (literally "live oak plain") contains a semantically similar morpheme (Japanese  kashi "live oak, evergreen Quercus spp.").
Nara could be a loanword from Old Korean, related to Middle Korean narah and Modern Korean nara (: "country", "nation", "kingdom"). This idea was put forward by a linguist Matsuoka Shizuo. American linguist Samuel E. Martin notes that the earliest attestation of this word in Korean sources—given in an eighth-century hyangga text, in the phonogramic form —should be read as NAL[A-]ak. This is similar to the form implied by the Old Japanese writings of Nara that transcribe the second syllable with 楽 (raku), and Martin notes that the city name has been "long suspected of being a borrowing from the Korean word". Kusuhara et al. argues that this hypothesis cannot account for the fact there are many places named Nara, Naru and Naro besides this Nara.
There is the idea that Nara is akin to Tungusic na. In some Tungusic languages such as Orok (and likely Goguryeo language), na means earth, land or the like. Some have speculated about a connection between these Tungusic words and Old Japanese nawi, an archaic and somewhat obscure word that appears in the verb phrases nawi furu and nawi yoru ('an earthquake occurs, to have an earthquake').

The "flat land" theory is adopted by Nihon Kokugo Daijiten (the largest dictionary of Japanese language), various dictionaries for place names, history books on Nara, and the like today, and it is regarded as the most likely.

History

Pre-Nara and origins

By decree of an edict on March 11, 708 AD, Empress Genmei ordered the court to relocate to the new capital, Nara. Once known as Heijō or Heijō-kyō, the city was established as Japan's first permanent capital in 710 CE; it was the seat of government until 784 CE, albeit with a five-year interruption, lasting from 741 to 745 CE. Heijō, as the ‘penultimate court’, however, was abandoned by the order of Emperor Kammu in 784 CE in favor of the temporary site of Nagaoka, and then Heian-kyō (Kyoto) which retained the status of capital for 1,100 years, until the Meiji Emperor made the final move to Edo in 1869 CE. This first relocation was due to the court's transformation from an imperial nobility to a force of metropolitan elites and new technique of dynastic shedding which had refashioned the relationship between court, nobility, and country. Moreover, the ancient capital lent its name to Nara period.

As a reactionary expression to the political centralization of China, the city of Nara (Heijō) was modeled after the Tang capital at Chang’an. Nara was laid out on a grid—which was based upon the Handen system—whereby the city was divided by four great roads. Likewise, according to Chinese cosmology, the ruler's place was fixed like the pole star. By dominating the capital, the ruler brought heaven to earth. Thus, the south-facing palace centered at the north, bisected the ancient city, instituting ‘Right Capital’ and ‘Left Capital’ zones. As Nara came to be a center of Buddhism in Japan and a prominent pilgrimage site, the city plan incorporated various pre-Heijō and Heijō period temples, of which the Yakushiji and the Todaiji still stand.

Politics
A number of scholars have characterized the Nara period as a time of penal and administrative legal order. The Taihō Code called for the establishment of administrative sects underneath the central government, and modeled many of the codes from the Chinese Tang dynasty. The code eventually disbanded, but its contents were largely preserved in the Yōrō Code of 718.

Occupants of the throne during the period gradually shifted their focus from military preparation to religious rites and institutions, in an attempt to strengthen their divine authority over the population.

Religion and temples
 Nanto Rokushū
With the establishment of the new capital, Asuka-dera, the temple of the Soga clan, was relocated within Nara. The Emperor Shōmu ordered the construction of Tōdai-ji Temple (largest wooden building in the world) and the world's largest bronze Buddha statue. The temples of Nara, known collectively as the Nanto Shichi Daiji, remained spiritually significant even beyond the move of the political capital to Heian-kyō in 794, thus giving Nara a synonym of Nanto ( "the southern capital").

On December 2, 724 AD, in order to increase the visual "magnificence" of the city, an edict was ordered by the government for the noblemen and the wealthy to renovate the roofs, pillars, and walls of their homes, although at that time this was unfeasible.

Sightseeing in Nara city became popular in the Edo period, during which several visitors' maps of Nara were widely published. During the Meiji Period, the Kofukuji Temple lost some land and its monks were converted into Shinto priests, due to Buddhism being associated with the old shogunate.

Modern Nara
Although Nara was the capital of Japan from 710 to 794, it was not designated a city until 1 February 1898. Nara has since developed from a town of commerce in the Edo and Meiji periods to a modern tourist city, due to its large number of historical temples, landmarks and national monuments. Nara was added to the UNESCO World Heritage Sites list in December 1998. The architecture of some shops, ryokans and art galleries has been adapted from traditional merchant houses.

Nara holds traditional festivals every year, including the Neri-Kuyo Eshiki, a spring festival held in Todaiji temple for over 1,000 years; and the Kemari Festival, in which people wear costumes ranging across 700 years and play traditional games).

In 1909, Tatsuno Kingo designed the Nara Hotel, whose architecture combined modern elements with traditional Japanese style.

On 8 July 2022, former Prime Minister of Japan Shinzo Abe was shot and killed by Tetsuya Yamagami with a homemade firearm in Nara while campaigning. There is currently an ongoing investigation into the assassination.

Geography
The city of Nara lies in the northern end of Nara Prefecture, directly bordering Kyoto Prefecture to its north. As a result of the latest merger, effective April 1, 2005, that combined the villages of Tsuge and Tsukigase with the city of Nara, the city now borders Mie Prefecture directly to its east.

Nara city, as well as several important settlements (such as Kashihara, Yamatokōriyama, Tenri, Yamatotakada, Sakurai and Goze), are located in the Nara Basin. This makes it the most densely-populated region of Nara Prefecture.

Climate
The climate of Nara Prefecture is generally temperate, although there are notable differences between the north-western basin area and the rest of the prefecture which is more mountainous.

The basin area climate has an inland characteristic, as represented in the higher daily temperature variance, and the difference between summer and winter temperatures. There has not been a single year since 1990 with more than 10 days of snowfall recorded by Nara Local Meteorological Observatory.

The climate in the rest of the prefecture is that of higher elevations especially in the south, with  being the extreme minimum in winter. Heavy rainfall is often observed in summer.

Spring and fall temperatures are temperate and comfortable. The mountainous region of Yoshino has been long popular for viewing cherry blossoms in the spring. In autumn, the southern mountains are also a popular destination for viewing fall foliage.

Cityscape

Demographics
, the city has an estimated population of 359,666 and a population density of 1,300 persons per km2. There were 160,242 households residing in Nara. The highest concentration of both households and population, respectively about 46,000 and 125,000, is found along the newer bedtown districts, along the Kintetsu line connecting to Osaka.

There were about 3,000 registered foreigners in the city, of which Koreans and Chinese are the two largest groups with about 1,200 and 800 people respectively.

Landmarks and culture

Buddhist temples
Tōdai-ji, including Nigatsu-dō and Shōsōin
Saidai-ji
Kōfuku-ji
Gangō-ji
Yakushi-ji
Tōshōdai-ji
Shin-Yakushi-ji
Akishino-dera
Byakugō-ji
Daian-ji
Enjō-ji
Enshō-ji
Futai-ji
Hannya-ji
Hokke-ji
Kikō-ji
Ryōsen-ji
Shōryaku-ji

Shinto shrines

Himuro Shrine
Kasuga Shrine
Tamukeyama Hachiman Shrine

Former imperial palace
Heijō Palace

Museums

Nara National Museum
Nara Municipal Buried Cultural Properties Research Centre
Nara City Historical Materials Preservation House
Nara Prefectural Museum of Art
Irie Taikichi Memorial Museum of Photography Nara City
Nakano Museum of Art
Neiraku Museum
Shōhaku Art Museum
Yamato Bunkakan

Gardens

Isuien Garden
Kyūseki Teien
Manyo Botanical Garden, Nara
Yoshiki-en

Other
Naramachi
Nara Park
Nara Hotel
Nara National Research Institute for Cultural Properties
Yagyū

Music

Tipsy night, a rock band from Nara, contributed the theme song for the Naruto: Gekitō Ninja Taisen! 4 (僕の愛してるだれもいない) games

Events

Nara Marathon
Nara Centennial Hall
Nara Kasugano International Forum Iraka
Shuni-e

Deer in Nara

According to the legendary history of Kasuga Shrine, the god Takemikazuchi arrived in Nara on a white deer to guard the newly built capital of Heijō-kyō. Since then, the deer have been regarded as heavenly animals, protecting the city and the country.

Tame sika deer (also known as spotted deer or Japanese deer) roam through the town, especially in Nara Park. In 2015, there were more than 1,200 sika deer in Nara. Snack vendors sell sika senbei (deer crackers) to visitors so they can feed the deer. Some deer have learned to bow in order to receive senbei from people.

Education
, there are 16 high schools and 6 universities located in the city of Nara.

Universities

Nara Women's University is one of only two national women's universities in Japan. Nara Institute of Science and Technology is a graduate research university specializing in biological, information, and materials sciences.

Primary and secondary education

Public schools
Public elementary and junior high schools are operated by the city of Nara.

Public high schools are operated by the Nara Prefecture.

Private schools
Private high schools in Nara include the Tōdaiji Gakuen, a private school founded by the temple in 1926.

Transportation

The main central station of Nara is Kintetsu Nara Station with JR Nara station some 500m west and much closer to Shin-Omiya station.

Rail
West Japan Railway Company
Kansai Main Line (Yamatoji Line): Narayama Station – Nara Station
Sakurai Line (Manyō-Mahoroba Line): Nara Station – Kyōbate Station – Obitoke Station
Kintetsu Railway
Nara Line: Tomio Station – Gakuen-mae Station – Ayameike Station – Yamato-Saidaiji Station – Shin-Ōmiya Station – Kintetsu Nara Station
Kyoto Line: Takanohara Station – Heijō Station – Yamato-Saidaiji Station
Kashihara Line: Yamato-Saidaiji Station – Amagatsuji Station – Nishinokyō Station
Keihanna Line: Gakken Nara-Tomigaoka Station

Roads
Expressways
Keinawa Expressway (Under construction)
Hanshin Expressway Dainihanna Route 
Japan National Route 24
Japan National Route 25
Japan National Route 169
Japan National Route 308
Japan National Route 369
Japan National Route 370

Twin towns – sister cities

International
Nara's sister cities are:

 Canberra, Australia
 Gyeongju, Gyeongsangbuk-do, South Korea
 Toledo, Province of Toledo, Spain
 Versailles, Yvelines, France
 Xi'an, Shaanxi, China
 Yangzhou, Jiangsu, China

Domestic

 Dazaifu, Fukuoka Prefecture, Japan
 Kōriyama, Fukushima Prefecture, Japan
 Obama, Fukui Prefecture, Japan
 Tagajō, Miyagi Prefecture, Japan
 Usa, Ōita Prefecture, Japan

In popular culture
Nara is featured in the anime and manga, Tonikawa: Fly Me to the Moon.

Nara is the inspiring location for the 2014 album This Is All Yours by English indie rock band Alt-J

References

External links

 Nara City official website
 The Official Nara Travel Guide
 

 
710 establishments
Buddhist pilgrimage sites in Japan
Cities in Nara Prefecture
Former capitals of Japan
Holy cities
Populated places established in the 8th century